Chad Fletcher (born 30 August 1979) is a former Australian rules footballer who played for the West Coast Eagles in the Australian Football League (AFL). He also played for the Subiaco Football Club and the Claremont Football Club in the West Australian Football League (WAFL). From Perth, Western Australia, Fletcher was recruited by West Coast in the 1998 Rookie Draft, and made his debut for the club in 1999. Having represented Australia in the 2003 International Rules Series against Ireland, he was subsequently named in the All-Australian team in 2004.

Football career

Early career
Fletcher began his professional football career in the West Australian Football League with Subiaco, and was elevated from the West Coast rookie list in 1998. He made his AFL debut in 1999, but did not make his mark on the league until 2002.

Career rise
Fletcher was 4th in the West Coast Best & Fairest voting in 2002 before he improved to 3rd in 2003 and 2nd in 2004. In 2003, Fletcher was selected to play for Australia in the International Rules series against Ireland, and in 2004 he was named to the interchange bench of his first All-Australian team.

Fletcher was one of the most prolific ballwinners in the AFL, and played in the West Coast midfield with Daniel Kerr.
Chad Fletcher was sometimes forgotten in West Coast's incredible midfield but did show he was very skillful.

Fletcher is also remembered for running into a fence while practicing a training drill blindfolded in 2005, an initiative by coach John Worsfold. He was not injured.

2006 season
Fletcher was also known as a "prolific" ballwinner who could accumulate many possessions in a game. However 2006 saw him considered one of the least accurate kicks in the league, costing the Eagles many turnovers. He was ranked 1st in clangers per game at West Coast in 2006.

Retirement from AFL
Fletcher was told that he was not needed in 2010 and beyond, playing his last AFL game in round 22, 2009 against Richmond.

Fletcher spent the 2010 season playing for the Balmain Dockers in the Sydney Football League, but retired after the Dockers did not make finals.

Personal life
During West Coast's 2006 end of year holiday in Las Vegas, Fletcher had overdosed on drugs and had a brush with death after reportedly choking on his own vomit. Fletcher was rushed to hospital and had to be revived after he stopped breathing. His case was so serious he spent four days in a hospital and flew straight back to Perth after checking out.

In August 2010, Fletcher was arrested and later pleaded guilty to possession of cocaine, outside the Kings Cross nightclub Hugo's. Fletcher escaped conviction and was placed on a nine-month good behaviour bond.

In 2014, Fletcher lost his license and was fined $1600 for drink-driving. He was recorded as having a .08 blood alcohol level at the time.

Statistics

|- style="background-color: #EAEAEA"
! scope="row" style="text-align:center" | 1999
|style="text-align:center;"|
| 41 || 1 || 0 || 0 || 1 || 1 || 2 || 1 || 0 || 0.0 || 0.0 || 1.0 || 1.0 || 2.0 || 1.0 || 0.0
|-
! scope="row" style="text-align:center" | 2000
|style="text-align:center;"|
| 41 || 17 || 11 || 6 || 181 || 90 || 271 || 48 || 23 || 0.6 || 0.4 || 10.6 || 5.3 || 15.9 || 2.8 || 1.4
|- style="background:#eaeaea;"
! scope="row" style="text-align:center" | 2001
|style="text-align:center;"|
| 7 || 20 || 8 || 7 || 253 || 126 || 379 || 81 || 45 || 0.4 || 0.4 || 12.7 || 6.3 || 19.0 || 4.1 || 2.3
|-
! scope="row" style="text-align:center" | 2002
|style="text-align:center;"|
| 7 || 18 || 10 || 4 || 212 || 125 || 337 || 72 || 49 || 0.6 || 0.2 || 11.8 || 6.9 || 18.7 || 4.0 || 2.7
|- style="background:#eaeaea;"
! scope="row" style="text-align:center" | 2003
|style="text-align:center;"|
| 7 || 20 || 10 || 9 || 290 || 163 || 453 || 71 || 61 || 0.5 || 0.5 || 14.5 || 8.2 || 22.7 || 3.6 || 3.1
|- 
! scope="row" style="text-align:center" | 2004
|style="text-align:center;"|
| 7 || 22 || 7 || 13 || 277 || 281 || 558 || 98 || 70 || 0.3 || 0.6 || 12.6 || 12.8 || 25.4 || 4.5 || 3.2
|- style="background:#eaeaea;"
! scope="row" style="text-align:center" | 2005
|style="text-align:center;"|
| 7 || 25 || 17 || 13 || 355 || 234 || 589 || 133 || 46 || 0.7 || 0.5 || 14.2 || 9.4 || 23.6 || 5.3 || 1.8
|- 
! scope="row" style="text-align:center" | 2006
|style="text-align:center;"|
| 7 || 24 || 5 || 12 || 308 || 235 || 543 || 116 || 59 || 0.2 || 0.5 || 12.8 || 9.8 || 22.6 || 4.8 || 2.5
|- style="background:#eaeaea;"
! scope="row" style="text-align:center" | 2007
|style="text-align:center;"|
| 7 || 10 || 3 || 1 || 129 || 106 || 235 || 52 || 33 || 0.3 || 0.1 || 12.9 || 10.6 || 23.5 || 5.2 || 3.3
|- 
! scope="row" style="text-align:center" | 2008
|style="text-align:center;"|
| 7 || 17 || 3 || 1 || 176 || 213 || 389 || 77 || 39 || 0.2 || 0.1 || 10.4 || 12.5 || 22.9 || 4.5 || 2.3
|- style="background:#eaeaea;"
! scope="row" style="text-align:center" | 2009
|style="text-align:center;"|
| 7 || 5 || 0 || 2 || 56 || 60 || 116 || 30 || 7 || 0.0 || 0.4 || 11.2 || 12.0 || 23.2 || 6.0 || 1.4
|- class="sortbottom"
! colspan=3| Career
! 179
! 74
! 68
! 2238
! 1634
! 3872
! 779
! 432
! 0.4
! 0.4
! 12.5
! 9.1
! 21.6
! 4.4
! 2.4
|}

References

External links

1979 births
All-Australians (AFL)
Claremont Football Club players
Living people
Australian rules footballers from Perth, Western Australia
Subiaco Football Club players
West Coast Eagles players
West Coast Eagles Premiership players
Balmain Australian Football Club players
One-time VFL/AFL Premiership players